The following is a list of New Zealand double international sportspeople; that is, New Zealanders who have represented their nation in full international sporting events in more than one sport.

Men

Association football and cricket
Grahame Bilby
Ces Dacre
Ken Hough
Don McRae
Vic Pollard

Note: Hough has the unique distinction of playing cricket for New Zealand and football for both New Zealand and Australia.

Badminton and cricket
Phil Horne

Canoeing and surf lifesaving
Cory Hutchings

Canoeing and swimming
Steven Ferguson

Cricket and rugby union
Bill Carson
George Dickinson
Brian McKechnie
Charlie Oliver
Curly Page
Eric Tindill
Jeff Wilson

Note: Martin Donnelly represented New Zealand at cricket and England at rugby union. Ofisa Tonu'u played rugby union for both Samoa and New Zealand, and cricket for Samoa. Eric Tindill uniquely not only played international cricket and rugby union but also officiated as a test cricket umpire and international rugby referee.

Cycling and powerlifting
Eddie Dawkins

Cycling and rowing
Hamish Bond

Cycling and speed skating
Chris Nicholson

Ki-o-Rahi and rugby
Buck Shelford

Rugby league and rugby union
In all, 37 sportsmen have represented New Zealand at both rugby codes. The full list can be found at List of dual-code rugby internationals#New Zealand. Below are some of the more notable dual internationals:

Frano Botica – represented New Zealand in both codes, and also represented Croatia in rugby union
Marc Ellis
Craig Innes
George Nēpia
Matthew Ridge
John Timu
Sonny Bill Williams – also represented New Zealand in rugby sevens

Rugby league for New Zealand and rugby union for another country
Shontayne Hape (represented England at rugby union)
Frederick Stanley Jackson (represented the British Lions at rugby union)
Emosi Koloto (represented Tonga at rugby union)
Tasesa Lavea (represented Samoa at rugby union)
Dally Messenger (represented Australia at rugby union)
Henry Paul (represented England at rugby union)
Lesley Vainikolo (represented England at rugby union)

Rugby union for New Zealand and rugby league for another country
John Schuster (represented Samoa at rugby league)
Brad Thorn (represented Australia at rugby league)
Va'aiga Tuigamala (represented Samoa at rugby league)

Note: Frano Botica represented New Zealand at both codes, and also represented Croatia at rugby union.

Water polo and rugby league
Brent Todd

Women

Association football and cricket
Rebecca Rolls

Association football and rugby union
Melissa Ruscoe
Note: Ruscoe has not only represented New Zealand in both sports, but has also captained both the Football Ferns and Black Ferns.

Rugby and Volleyball 
Kimberly Smith
Volleyferns captain

Basketball and cricket
Suzie Bates

Basketball and netball
The following New Zealand netball internationals also played for the New Zealand women's national basketball team.

Beach volleyball and netball
Anna Scarlett

Cricket and hockey
Sophie Devine
Liz Perry
Betty Watt (née Thorner)

Cross-country skiing, cycling, and endurance equestrian events
Madonna Harris

See also
List of dual-code rugby internationals
List of cricket and rugby union players

References

Double International